Pinnotheres is a genus of crabs, including the pea crab. Many species formerly in Pinnotheres have been placed in new genera, such as Zaops ostreus (formerly P. ostreus), the oyster crab and Nepinnotheres novaezelandiae (formerly P. novaezelandiae), the New Zealand pea crab. The species currently recognised in the genus Pinnotheres are:

Pinnotheres atrinae Sakai, 1939
Pinnotheres atrinicola Page, 1983
Pinnotheres bidentatus Sakai, 1939
Pinnotheres bipunctatus Nicolet, 1849
Pinnotheres boninensis Stimpson, 1858
Pinnotheres borradailei Nobili, 1905
Pinnotheres corbiculae Sakai, 1939
Pinnotheres coutierei Nobili, 1905
Pinnotheres cyclinus Gordon, 1932
Pinnotheres dilatatus Shen, 1932
Pinnotheres dofleini Lenz, 1914
Pinnotheres edwardsi de Man, 1887
Pinnotheres excussus Dai, Feng, Song & Chen, 1980
Pinnotheres globosus Hombron & Jacquinot, 1846
Pinnotheres gordonae Shen, 1932
Pinnotheres guerini H. Milne-Edwards, 1853
Pinnotheres haiyangensis Shen, 1932
Pinnotheres hanumantharaoi Devi & Shyamasundari, 1989
Pinnotheres hemphilli Rathbun, 1918
Pinnotheres hickmani (Guiler, 1950)
Pinnotheres hirtimanus H. Milne-Edwards, 1853
Pinnotheres jamesi Rathbun, 1923
Pinnotheres kamensis Rathbun, 1909
Pinnotheres kutensis Rathbun, 1900
Pinnotheres lanensis Rathbun, 1909
Pinnotheres laquei Sakai, 1961
Pinnotheres latipes Jacquinot in Hombron & Jacquinot, 1846
Pinnotheres lithodomi Smith, 1870
Pinnotheres luminatus Dai, Feng, Song & Chen, 1980
Pinnotheres lutescens Nobili, 1905
Pinnotheres mactricola Alcock, 1900
Pinnotheres maindroni Nobili, 1905
Pinnotheres margaritiferae Laurie, 1906
Pinnotheres nigrans Rathbun, 1909
Pinnotheres obesus Dana, 1852
Pinnotheres obscuridentata Dai & Song, 1986
Pinnotheres obscurus Stimpson, 1858
Pinnotheres onychodactylus Tesch, 1918
Pinnotheres orcutti Rathbun, 1918
Pinnotheres ostrea (Aikawa, 1933)
Pinnotheres paralatissimus Dai & Song, 1986
Pinnotheres parvulus Stimpson, 1858
Pinnotheres pectunculi Hesse, 1872
Pinnotheres perezi Nobili, 1905
Pinnotheres pholadis De Haan, 1835
Pinnotheres pichilinquei Rathbun, 1923
Pinnotheres pilulus Dai, Feng, Song & Chen, 1980
Pinnotheres pilumnoides Nobili, 1905
Pinnotheres pisum (Linnaeus, 1767)
Pinnotheres pubescens (Holmes, 1894)
Pinnotheres pugettensis Holmes, 1900
Pinnotheres purpureus Alcock, 1900
Pinnotheres quadratus Rathbun, 1909
Pinnotheres ridgewayi Southwell, 1911
Pinnotheres rouxi H. Milne-Edwards, 1853
Pinnotheres sanguinolariae Pillai, 1951
Pinnotheres sebastianensis (Rodrigues da Costa, 1970)
Pinnotheres serrignathus Shen, 1932
Pinnotheres shoemakeri Rathbun, 1918
Pinnotheres siamensis Rathbun, 1909
Pinnotheres socius Lanchester, 1902
Pinnotheres taichungae K. Sakai, 2000
Pinnotheres taylori Rathbun, 1918
Pinnotheres tenuipes Borradaile, 1903
Pinnotheres trichopus Tesch, 1918
Pinnotheres tsingtaoensis Shen, 1932
Pinnotheres vicajii Chhapgar, 1957

References

Pinnotheroidea